The women's competition in the middleweight (– 63 kg) division was held on 20 September 2010.

Schedule

Medalists

Records

Results

New records

References
(Page 33) Start List
Results

- Women's 63 kg, 2010 World Weightlifting Championships
2010 in women's weightlifting